Fruitland is a city along the Snake and Payette rivers in Payette County, Idaho, United States. It is part of the Ontario Micropolitan Area. Fruitland is named after apple orchards that surround the community, and its slogan is "The Big Apple of Idaho."

As of the 2010 census, the city had a total population of 4,684, up from 3,805 in 2000.

Geography
Fruitland is located within the Snake River watershed.

Demographics

2020 census
Note: the US Census treats Hispanic/Latino as an ethnic category. This table excludes Latinos from the racial categories and assigns them to a separate category. Hispanics/Latinos can be of any race.

As of the 2020 United States census, there were 6,072 people, 2,108 households, and 1,286 families residing in the city.

2010 census

As of the census of 2010, there were 4,684 people, 1,700 households, and 1,243 families living in the city. The racial makeup of the city was 84.0% White, 0.5% African American, 1.0% Native American, 1.1% Asian, 0.1% Pacific Islander, 10.3% from other races, and 2.8% from two or more races. Hispanic or Latino of any race were 22.6% of the population.

There were 1,700 households, of which 42.5% had children under the age of 18 living with them, 55.0% were married couples living together, 12.8% had a female householder with no husband present, 5.3% had a male householder with no wife present, and 26.9% were non-families. 23.5% of all households were made up of individuals, and 12% had someone living alone who was 65 years of age or older. The average household size was 2.76 and the average family size was 3.26.

The median age in the city was 32.7 years. 31.7% of residents were under the age of 18; 7.8% were between the ages of 18 and 24; 25.4% were from 25 to 44; 21.1% were from 45 to 64; and 13.9% were 65 years of age or older. The gender makeup of the city was 48.8% male and 51.2% female.

2000 census
As of the census of 2000, there were 3,805 people, 1,378 households, and 1,044 families living in the city. The racial makeup of the city was 87.70% White, 0.89% Asian, 0.60% Native American,  0.05% African American, 0.03% Pacific Islander, 8.02% from other races, and 2.71% from two or more races. Hispanic or Latino of any race were 17.92% of the population.

There were 1,378 households, out of which 40.6% had children under the age of 18 living with them, 58.1% were married couples living together, 13.1% had a female householder with no husband present, and 24.2% were non-families. 21.4% of all households were made up of individuals, and 10.6% had someone living alone who wais 65 years of age or older.  The average household size was 2.76 and the average family size was 3.20.

In the city, the population was spread out, with 31.9% under the age of 18, 9.0% from 18 to 24, 27.6% from 25 to 44, 18.6% from 45 to 64, and 12.9% who were 65 years of age or older.  The median age was 31 years.  For every 100 females, there were 93.8 males.  For every 100 females age 18 and over, there were 87.3 males.

The median income for a household in the city was $32,469, and the median income for a family was $36,614. Males had a median income of $31,419 versus $22,000 for females. The per capita income for the city was $14,488.  About 8.3% of families and 11.9% of the population were below the poverty line, including 15.6% of those under the age of 18 and 14.0% of those 65 and older.

See also

 List of cities in Idaho

References

External links

 
 Fruitland Chamber of Commerce
 Payette County USGenWeb

Cities in Idaho
Cities in Payette County, Idaho
Ontario, Oregon micropolitan area